The Honourable John Mordaunt (c. 1709 – 1 July 1767) was a British Army officer and politician.

Mordaunt was the second son of John Mordaunt, Viscount Mordaunt and Frances Powlett and educated at Westminster School. He joined the Army as a cornet in the Royal Horse Guards from 1726 to 1736. In 1745, during the Jacobite Rebellion, he rejoined the Army to serve as the lieutenant colonel of the Duke of Kingston's Regiment of Light Horse, which he commanded at the Battle of Culloden.

He was elected to Parliament in 1739 as the member for Nottinghamshire, sitting until 1747, and was then elected to represent Winchelsea until 1754. He lastly sat for Christchurch from 1754 to 1761.

He died in 1767. He had married in November, 1735 the Hon. Mary Howe (d. 1749), the daughter of Scrope Howe, 1st Viscount Howe and the widow of Thomas Herbert, 8th Earl of Pembroke. He secondly married Elizabeth Hamilton, but left no children by either wife.

References

1700s births
1767 deaths
Younger sons of viscounts
People educated at Westminster School, London
Royal Horse Guards officers
British Army personnel of the Jacobite rising of 1745
Members of the Parliament of Great Britain for English constituencies
British MPs 1734–1741
British MPs 1741–1747
British MPs 1747–1754
British MPs 1754–1761